Michel van Schendel (June 16, 1929 - October 9, 2005) was a French-born Canadian writer and journalist from Quebec.

Born in Asnières-sur-Seine, France in 1929 to Belgian parents, van Schendel emigrated to Quebec in 1952. He worked as a journalist for the Société Radio-Canada for several years before joining the Université du Québec à Montréal as a professor in 1969, holding that position until his retirement in 1998.

He published his first poetry collection, Poèmes de l'Amérique étrangère, in 1958. He published work only intermittently for many years thereafter, with his work increasing in frequency around the late 1970s and early 1980s. He won the Governor General's Award for French-language poetry or drama at the 1980 Governor General's Awards for De l'oeil et de l'écoute, but donated his prize money to striking Canadian Broadcasting Corporation employees and the Salvadoran Solidarity Committee. He was later nominated in the French-language poetry category at the 1998 Governor General's Awards for Bitumes.

In 2003 he won the Prix Athanase-David from the government of Quebec for his body of work, and the Prix Victor-Barbeau for his non-fiction work Un temps éventuel.

He died of cancer in October 2005.

Works

Non-fiction 
 La Poésie et nous (1958), in collaboration with Gilles Hénault, Jacques Brault, Wilfrid Lemoine and Yves Préfontaine
 Ducharme l'inquiétant (1967)
 Rebonds critiques (1992)
 Jousse ou la traversée de l'Amérique (1996)
 Un temps éventuel (2002)
 L'Œil allumé (2004)
 Écrits politiques (2007)

Poetry 
 Poèmes de l'Amérique étrangère (1958)
 Variations sur la pierre (1964)
 La Têt con navet (1977)
 Veiller ne plus veiller (1978)
 De l'œil et de l'écoute (1980)
 Autres, autrement (1983)
 Sédiments 86 (1986), in collaboration with Georges Leroux
 L'Impression du souci (1993)
 Bitumes (1998)
 Quand demeure (2002)
 Poèmes de flèche et de plume (2004)
 Choses nues passage (2004)
 Mille pas dans le jardin font aussi le tour du monde (2005)
 L'Oiseau, le Vieux-Port et le Charpentier (2006)
 Il dit (2008), publication posthume

Art books 
Collaborations with artist Louis-Pierre Bougie:
 Terre brune (2004)
 Le jardinier (2005)
 Les mots griffonnés (2011)

References

1929 births
2005 deaths
20th-century Canadian poets
20th-century Canadian non-fiction writers
20th-century Canadian male writers
21st-century Canadian poets
21st-century Canadian non-fiction writers
21st-century Canadian male writers
Canadian male poets
Canadian male non-fiction writers
Canadian poets in French
Canadian non-fiction writers in French
Canadian people of Belgian descent
French emigrants to Canada
Fellows of the Royal Society of Canada
Academic staff of the Université du Québec à Montréal
Writers from Montreal
People from Asnières-sur-Seine
Governor General's Award-winning poets